Morrow House may refer to:

Morrow-Hudson House, Tempe, Arizona, listed on the NRHP in Maricopa County, Arizona
Morrow Hall, Batesville, Arkansas, listed on the NRHP in Independence County, Arkansas
James Morrow House, Newark, Delaware, listed on the National Register of Historic Places in New Castle County
Morrow House (Somerset, Kentucky), listed on the National Register of Historic Places in Pulaski County, Kentucky
Johnson Morrow House, Callao, Missouri, listed on the National Register of Historic Places in Macon County, Missouri
Royal and Louise Morrow House, Brevard, North Carolina, listed on the National Register of Historic Places in Transylvania County, North Carolina
William P. Morrow House, Graham, North Carolina, listed on the National Register of Historic Places in Alamance County, North Carolina
Morrow-Overman-Fairley House, Hillsboro, Ohio, listed on the National Register of Historic Places in Highland County, Ohio